T. robusta  may refer to:
 Tasiocera robusta, a crane fly species in the genus Tasiocera
 Terebra robusta, a sea snail species
 Triplophysa robusta, a ray-finned fish species
 Tyto robusta, a prehistoric barn-owl species that lived in what is now Monte Gargano in Italy

See also
 Robusta (disambiguation)